Łęg  may refer to the following places in Poland:
A former name for the town of Ełk (north-east Poland)
Part of the Czyżyny district of Kraków
Łęg, Pleszew County in Greater Poland Voivodeship (west-central Poland)
Łęg, Śrem County in Greater Poland Voivodeship (west-central Poland)
Łęg, Kuyavian-Pomeranian Voivodeship (north-central Poland)
Łęg, Łódź Voivodeship (central Poland)
Łęg, Lower Silesian Voivodeship (south-west Poland)
Łęg, Mława County in Masovian Voivodeship (east-central Poland)
Łęg, Piaseczno County in Masovian Voivodeship (east-central Poland)
Łęg, Częstochowa County in Silesian Voivodeship (south Poland)
Łęg, Lubliniec County in Silesian Voivodeship (south Poland)
Łęg, Racibórz County in Silesian Voivodeship (south Poland)
Łęg, Gmina Osiek in Świętokrzyskie Voivodeship (south-central Poland)
Łęg, Gmina Połaniec in Świętokrzyskie Voivodeship (south-central Poland)